James Calthorpe may refer to:

James Calthorpe of Cockthorpe (c. 1558–1614), Sheriff of Norfolk in 1614
James Calthorpe of East Barsham (1604–1652), Sheriff of Norfolk in 1643
Sir James Calthorpe (Roundhead) (died 1658), Sheriff of Suffolk, knighted by the Lord Protector Olive Cromwell
James Calthorpe (Yeoman of the Removing Wardrobe) (1699–1784), English politician and courtier

See also 
Calthorpe (surname)